New Jersey Schaefer Brewers was an American soccer club that was a member of the American Soccer League.

Established as the New Jersey Schaefer Brewers, they became the New Jersey Brewers after their first season.  The team folded after the 1975 season and was replaced in the league by the New Jersey Americans.

Year-by-year

References

External links
 Annual American Soccer League standings

Defunct soccer clubs in New Jersey
American Soccer League (1933–1983) teams
1975 disestablishments in New Jersey
1972 establishments in New Jersey
Association football clubs established in 1972
Association football clubs disestablished in 1975
Soccer clubs in New Jersey